Rzepiennik Marciszewski  is a village in the administrative district of Gmina Gromnik, within Tarnów County, Lesser Poland Voivodeship, in southern Poland.

The village has a population of 707.

References

Rzepiennik Marciszewski